Jean Vilar (25 March 1912– 28 May 1971) was a French actor and theatre director.

Vilar trained under actor and theatre director Charles Dullin, then toured with an acting company throughout France. His directorial career began in 1943 in a small theatre in Paris. In 1947, he accepted an invitation to direct the first annual drama festival at Avignon.

Frustrated with what he felt was the narrow élitist horizons of the theatre, he devoted himself to creating a "people's theatre" and became a dominant force in the decentralization of theatre. He created two major theatrical institutions, the Festival d'Avignon and the Théâtre National Populaire.  His policy was to make theatre accessible to the greatest possible number of people.

Like Paul Valery, he is buried in the Cimetiere Marin, Sete. On 18 July 1979 the theatre department of the Bibliothèque nationale de France, the city of Avignon and the Association Jean Vilar opened the Maison Jean-Vilar in the Hôtel de Crochans in Avignon to further Vilar's work, the Festival d'Avignon, the 'OFF' and theatre and performance in Avignon and the surrounding region.

Filmography

References

Other sources
 Bardot, Jean Claude (1991) Jean Vilar. Paris: Colin.
 Shevtsova, Maria (2005) Jean Vilar in Fifty Key Theatre Directors,  eds  Mitter, S., & In Shevtsova, M., Routledge
 Téphany, J., & Barthes, R. (1995). Jean Vilar. Paris: Editions de l'Herne.

1912 births
1971 deaths
People from Sète
French theatre managers and producers
French male stage actors
French scenic designers
20th-century French male actors